Dark Angel is a British two-part television drama miniseries, based on the adaptation of the book Mary Ann Cotton: Britain's First Female Serial Killer by David Wilson. The series was broadcast on 31 October and 7 November 2016, and starred Joanne Froggatt as protagonist Mary Ann Cotton, widely regarded as Britain's first known female serial killer, who was found guilty of murder in March 1873 for the murder of three of her husbands, allegedly in order to collect on their insurance policies.  The series was produced by World Productions and distributed by Endemol Shine.

The series co-starred Alun Armstrong as Mary Ann's step-father, George Stott, and Jonas Armstrong as her main love interest, Joe Nattrass. Penny Layden, Laura Morgan, Sam Hoare, and Emma Fielding also took starring roles in the two-part drama.

Production
In July 2015, production and filming began on Dark Angel, starring Joanne Froggatt of Downton Abbey as Mary Ann Cotton. Alun Armstrong, Jonas Armstrong and Emma Fielding also had roles in the series. Inspired by the book Mary Ann Cotton: Britain's First Female Serial Killer, the drama used writer David Wilson as a consultant during the script-writing stage. The drama is the seventh in a series of ITV mini-series featuring notorious British murder cases of the past two centuries, following on from This Is Personal: The Hunt for the Yorkshire Ripper (2000), Shipman (2002), A Is for Acid (2002), The Brides in the Bath (2003), See No Evil: The Moors Murders (2006), and Appropriate Adult (2011). It was followed by an eighth ITV mini-series entitled White House Farm and a ninth entitled Des (both 2020).

Cast
 Joanne Froggatt as Mary Ann Cotton, serial killer
 Alun Armstrong as George Stott, Mary Ann's stepfather
 Penny Layden as Margaret Stott, Mary Ann's mother
 Laura Morgan as Maggie Cotton, Mary Ann's best friend
 Jonas Armstrong as Joe Nattrass, Mary Ann's secret lover and later, fifth partner
 Sam Hoare as James Robinson, Mary Ann's third husband
 Emma Fielding as Helen Robinson, James's sister
 John Hollingworth as Dr. John Maling, district GP

Recurring characters
 Tom Varey as Billy Mowbray, Mary Ann's first husband
 Thomas Howes as George Ward, Mary Ann's second husband
 Isla McMonigle as Isabella Mowbray, Mary Ann and Billy's daughter
 Hayley Walters as Elizabeth Robinson, James' daughter
 Alexander McMonigle as James Robinson, Jr., James' son
 George Kent as William Robinson, James' son
 John Bowler as Mr. Johnson, life insurance agent
 Ferdy Roberts as John Quick-Manning, Mary Ann's final love interest
 Phil Cheadle as Dr. Kilburn, district GP
 Joanna Horton as Sarah Edwards, Mary Ann's neighbour
 Mark Holgate as William Edwards, Sarah's husband
 Mark Underwood as Fred Cotton, Maggie's brother and Mary Ann's fourth husband
 Jake Lawson as Charlie Cotton, Fred's son
 Seamus O'Neil as William Calcraft, hangman

Minor characters
 Laura-Jane Matthewson as Jane Headley
 Jacob Anderton as Issac Headley
 Jamie B. Chambers as Robert Evans
 Shaun Prendergast as Sergeant Hutchinson, local policeman
 George Potts as Mr. Wensolom, an insurance agent
 Paul Brennen as Mr. Riley, a local grocer and chemist
 Edward Gower as Mr. Stranger, a vicar
 Bill Fellows as Mr. Brownlee
 Niall Ashdown as Mr. Draper 
 Paul Bentall as the Seaham Minister
 Mike Burnside as the Sunderland Doctor
 Michael Culkin as the Sunderland Vicar
 Nigel Cooke as the Sunderland Minister

References

External links

2010s British crime drama television series
2010s British television miniseries
2016 British television series debuts
2016 British television series endings
British serial killer films
English-language television shows
ITV television dramas
Television series by ITV Studios
Television series by World Productions
Television series set in the 1850s
Television series set in the 1860s
Television series set in the 1870s
Television shows set in Tyne and Wear
True crime television series
Cultural depictions of female serial killers
Cultural depictions of British women